Gokulam Kerala is an Indian professional football club based in  Kozhikode, Kerala. The club began competing in the I-League, the first division of Indian football, in the 2017–18 I-League season.

, a total of 63 players have been registered on the squad with the Gokulam Kerala. This consists of 56 outfield players, and 7 goalkeepers. Henry Kisekka is the team's all-time top scorers with 7 goals in all competition.

Players

Foreign players

Indian Players

By nationality

References

 Lists of association football players by club in India
Association football player non-biographical articles